In tennis, the 2018 US Open Series was the fifteenth edition of the US Open Series, which comprises]d a group of hard court tournaments that started on July 23, 2018 in Atlanta and concluded in Connecticut for the women and in Winston-Salem for the men on August 26, 2018. This edition consisted of three separate men's tournaments and three women's tournaments, with the Western & Southern Open hosting both a men's and women's event. The series was headlined by two ATP World Tour Masters 1000 and two WTA Premier 5 events.

Tournament Schedule

Week 1

ATP – BB&T Atlanta Open

John Isner was the defending champion and successfully defended his title, defeating Ryan Harrison in a rematch of the 2017 final, 5–7, 6–3, 6–4.

Main Draw Finals

Week 2

WTA – Silicon Valley Classic (San Jose)

Madison Keys was the defending champion, but withdrew due to a wrist injury.

Mihaela Buzărnescu won her first WTA Tour singles title, defeating Maria Sakkari in the final, 6–1, 6–0.

Main Draw Finals

Week 3

ATP – Rogers Cup (Toronto)

Alexander Zverev was the defending champion, but lost in the quarterfinals to Stefanos Tsitsipas.

Rafael Nadal won his fourth Rogers Cup title, defeating Tsitsipas in the final, 6–2, 7–6(7–4).

Main Draw Finals

WTA – Rogers Cup (Montreal)

Elina Svitolina was the defending champion, but she lost to Sloane Stephens in the semifinals.

World No. 1 Simona Halep won the title, defeating Stephens in the final, 7–6(8–6), 3–6, 6–4.

Main Draw Finals

Week 4

ATP – Western & Southern Open (Cincinnati) 

Grigor Dimitrov was the defending champion, but lost to Novak Djokovic in the third round. 

Djokovic won the title, defeating Roger Federer in the final, 6–4, 6–4, becoming the first player to win all nine ATP Masters 1000 events since its inception in 1990.

Main Draw Finals

WTA – Western & Southern Open (Cincinnati) 

Garbiñe Muguruza was the defending champion, but lost in the second round to Lesia Tsurenko.

Kiki Bertens won her first hard court & Premier 5 level title by beating Simona Halep in the final, 2–6, 7–6(8–6), 6–2.

Main Draw Finals

Week 5

ATP – Winston-Salem Open 

Roberto Bautista Agut was the defending champion but chose not to participate this year.

Daniil Medvedev won the title, defeating Steve Johnson in the final, 6–4, 6–4.

Main Draw Finals

WTA – Connecticut Open (New Haven)

Daria Gavrilova was the defending champion, but lost to Aryna Sabalenka in the second round.

Sabalenka went on to win her first WTA Tour title, defeating Carla Suárez Navarro in the final, 6–1, 6–4.

Main Draw Finals

Weeks 6–7

ATP – US Open (New York)

Rafael Nadal was the defending champion, but retired in his semifinal match against Juan Martín del Potro.

Novak Djokovic won the title, his third at the US Open and 14th Grand Slam title overall, tying Pete Sampras, defeating del Potro in the final, 6–3, 7–6(7–4), 6–3.

Main Draw Finals

WTA – US Open (New York)

Sloane Stephens was the defending champion, but lost to Anastasija Sevastova in the quarterfinals.

Naomi Osaka won the title by defeating Serena Williams in the final, 6–2, 6–4.

Main Draw Finals

References

External links